Haemoproteus vacuolatus is a parasite. It was found in Andropadus latirostris in Ghana and Cameroon.

References

Parasites of birds
Haemosporida